A fashion show (French défilé de mode) is an event put on by a fashion designer to showcase their upcoming line of clothing and/or accessories during a fashion week.  Fashion shows debut every season, particularly the spring/summer and fall/winter seasons. This is where designers seek to promote their new fashions. The four major fashion weeks in the world, collectively known as the "Big 4", are those in Paris, London, Milan, and  New York. Berlin fashion week is also of global importance. 

In a typical fashion show, models walk the catwalk dressed in the clothing created by the designer.  Clothing is illuminated on the catwalk using lighting and special effects. The order in which each model walks out, wearing a specific outfit, is usually planned in accordance with the statement that the designer wants to make about their collection. It is then up to the audience to try to understand what the designer is trying to "say", visually deconstruct each outfit and appreciate the detail and craftsmanship of every piece.

Occasionally, fashion shows take the form of installations, where the models are static, standing or sitting in a constructed environment. A wide range of contemporary designers produce their shows as theatrical productions with elaborate sets and added elements such as live music or a technological components such as holograms or pre-recorded video backdrops.

History

19th and 20th centuries 

Because "the topic of fashion shows remains to find its historian", the earliest history of fashion shows remains obscure. In the 1800s, "fashion parades" periodically took place in Paris couture salons. At the turn of the 19th century, exclusive fashion houses in Europe, especially Paris and London, were using formal presentations to showcase their latest line to clientele. 

One of the designers of this concept, Charles Fredrick Worth, gained traction by displaying clothes on actual people instead of mannequins. American retailers imported the concept of the fashion show in the early 1900s.  The first American fashion show likely took place in 1903 in the New York City store of the Ehrlich Brothers.  By 1910, large department stores such as Wanamaker's in Manhattan and Philadelphia were also staging fashion shows.  These events showed couture gowns from Paris or the store's copies of them; they aimed to demonstrate the owners' good taste and capture the attention of female shoppers. As the popularity for these formal presentations expanded, it was in 1918 when fashion houses established fixed dates for runway shows to occur. These occurrences took place twice annually, specifically for fashion houses to plan for and promote their lines to foreign buyers. Runway shows were often held in department stores or hotels when they first began. European fashion houses would actively seek out buyers in the United States, specifically in larger cities, by hosting these runway shows.

By the 1920s, retailers across the United States held fashion shows.  Often, these shows were theatrical, presented with narratives, and organized around a theme (e.g. Parisian, Chinese, or Russian).  These shows enjoyed huge popularity through mid-century, sometimes attracting thousands of customers and gawkers.

In the 1970s and 1980s, American designers began to hold their own fashion shows in private spaces apart from such retailers.  In the early 1990s, however, many in the fashion world began to rethink this strategy.  After several mishaps during shows in small, unsafe locations, "[t]he general sentiment was, 'We love fashion but we don't want to die for it,'" recalls Fern Mallis, then executive director of the Council of Fashion Designers of America.  In response to these shows, the New York shows were centralized in Bryant Park during Fashion Week in late 1993.

Lately from the 2000s to today, fashion shows are usually also filmed and appear on specially assigned television channels or even in documentaries.

In recent years, fashion shows have become increasingly elaborate for many of the top labels, including sprawling sets that often come with higher costs.

21st century

Some designers have attempted to modernize the style and presentation of fashion shows by integrating technological advances in experimental ways, such as including pre-recorded digital videos as backdrops. During New York Fashion Week in 2014, designer Ralph Lauren presented his new Polo line for Spring 2015 in a water-screen projection in Manhattan's Central Park. Technological progress has also allowed a broader portion of the fashion industry's followers to experience shows. In 2010, London Fashion Week was the first fashion week to allow viewing of its shows through live streaming. Live streaming of runway shows and mediated shows has now become commonplace.

Tom Ford created a music video with Lady Gaga for his Spring/Summer 2016 women's collection.

Fashion shows showcase the new styles of the season. They are a walking art show and also guide the looks for the fast fashion stores who imitate the high fashion looks. "If fashion shows sometimes have a reputation for being shocking, that's because of one of their other main purposes: publicity." Fashion shows are a way of life to many people as well and set the tone for each year. People who come and watch the shows also get to experience an art form with their own eyes and be present in the industry. Fashion shows have changed through the digital area and the pandemic accelerated the course of becoming digital.

Format and setting 
A runway may be as basic as a narrow space between rows of chairs or more elaborate setups with multiple catwalks. Most runway shows are held inside, for shelter against the weather, but there are times when runway shows are held outdoors.  In the 2016 Paris Fashion Week, Chanel presented an elaborate setup by designing the hall as if it were an airport.  The viewing guests sat as if they were awaiting their flights while the models walked around the airport approaching ticket counters.

Models

With the creation of runway shows, the concept of runway modeling was rapidly established with the establishment of agencies and professional modeling careers. Before professional agencies, fashion houses that runway shows often had their own in house models who would specifically be fitted and costumes for each show. By having in house models to present the clothes for runway, the fashion houses could ensure that the clothing was perfectly altered for presentation and bound to sell. However, as the demand for models grew, the modeling agency was established to represent runway models.

Catwalk

The term 'catwalk' comes from the walkway, stage platform, or clearing used by models to demonstrate clothing and accessories during a fashion show. Catwalks used by designers to introduce new fashion lines and introduce new designers that grab the attention of consumers. In fashion jargon, "what's on the catwalk"  or similar phrasing can refer to whatever is new and popular in fashion. Some, especially in the United States, refer to the catwalk as a runway. The name might be used because the graceful stature and gait used by models reminds viewers of the poise of a cat's natural walk.

Terminology

Exclusive: When a model scores an exclusive for a fashion label it means that they have been picked to walk for that particular designer only. This might launch their career, elevate their status in the fashion industry and 'guarantee' them spots on the world's best catwalks.
Haute couture: A French phrase for high fashion. Runway shows were created to specifically display custom garments such as Haute couture.
Look book: A collection of photos taken of models wearing a designer or manufacturers clothing that is sent out to fashion editors, buyers, clients, and special customers to show the designer's looks for the season.
Sketches: Sketches, or illustrations, were the first way that designers would present clientele with their line. This is before mannequins and live runway models were established within the industry.

See also 

 Fashion
 Fashion design
 Fashion trend
 Fashion week
 Fetish fashion
 Haute couture
 List of fashion events

References

External links
 

 
Articles containing video clips